Wang Yi (born 19 October 1953) is a Chinese senior diplomat and politician who has been serving as Director of the Office of the Central Foreign Affairs Commission of the Chinese Communist Party (CCP), making him China's highest ranked diplomat. He was appointed State Councilor in 2018, which he served as until 2023, and was made a member of the CCP Politburo in 2022. He was the Foreign Minister of the People's Republic of China between 2013 and 2022.

Early and personal life 
Wang was born in Beijing. After graduating from high school in September 1969, he was sent to Northeast China. He subsequently served in the Northeast Construction Army Corps in Heilongjiang Province for eight years.

In December 1977, Wang returned to Beijing and in the same year was enrolled in the department of Asian and African Languages of Beijing International Studies University. He studied Japanese at the institution, graduating in February 1982 with a bachelor's degree. He is known to speak fluent  English and Japanese.

Early career (1982-2013)
Upon graduation from university, Wang was sent to the Asian section of the Ministry of Foreign Affairs by his father-in-law Qian Jiadong, where he began his career as a diplomat. In September 1989, he was sent to the Chinese embassy in Japan and served there for five years. When he returned to China in March 1994, Wang was appointed as vice section chief of the Asian section of the foreign ministry and was promoted to section chief the next year. From August 1997 to February 1998, Wang was a visiting scholar at the Institute of Foreign Relations of Georgetown University in the United States. Soon after his return, he was promoted to assistant minister and the director of office of policy research. From September 1999, Wang studied international relations at China Foreign Affairs University and obtained a doctoral degree. In February 2001, Wang was elevated to Deputy Minister of Foreign Affairs, in charge of Asian affairs. He was then the youngest Deputy Minister.

In September 2004, Wang was appointed as China's Ambassador to Japan. He served in this post until September 2007. In June 2008, Wang succeeded Chen Yunlin as the director of Taiwan Affairs Office of the State Council of China.

Minister of Foreign Affairs (2013-2022)

China's foreign policy under Xi Jinping's has been described as increasingly assertive, even to the point of being dubbed Wolf warrior diplomacy. In his inaugural press conference as Foreign Affairs Minister in March 2014, Wang characterized this new direction as "proactively striving for achievements to let the world hear of the Chinese solutions and Chinese voices." In 2017, Wang's leader described the "Two Guidances", the principles that: (1) China should guide the global community in building a more just and reasonable world order, and (2) that China should guide the global community in safeguarding international security. Following the "Two Guidances", Wang compared China as the "leading goat" in "guiding the reform of global governance."

In July 2016, Wang became an internet celebrity on the Chinese micro-blog Sina Weibo. A fan club on Weibo devoted to Wang has more than 130,000 followers.

Appointments 
On 16 March 2013, Wang was appointed Minister of Foreign Affairs after he was approved by the Congress.

In March 2018, Wang was appointed as a State Councillor.

Palestinian mediation 
 
Wang initiated a significant state visit to the Middle East in December 2013 to visit Israel and Palestine. He discussed with leaders of both countries the importance of the nuclear agreement with Iran and the importance of the continued peace talks, saying "War does not solve the problems. Violence increases the hatred. The peace talks are the appropriate and the only path". In November 2017, he expressed three points (counter-terrorism, negotiation and reconstruction) to improve Syria's situation.

China-Somalia Summit 
In June 2014, during the China-Arab summit in Beijing, Foreign Minister Wang met his Somali counterpart Abdirahman Duale Beyle to discuss bilateral cooperation between China and Somalia. The meeting was held at the Chinese foreign ministry center and focused on trade, security and reconstruction. Among the issues discussed were the various Chinese development projects that were in the process of being implemented in Somalia. Beyle also indicated that the Chinese authorities were slated to broaden their support for Somalia, which would serve to create new employment opportunities. Additionally, Wang commended the Somali federal government on its peace-building efforts. He likewise reaffirmed the historically close diplomatic ties between both territories, recalling China's recognition of the nascent Somali Republic in 1960 and Somalia's subsequent campaigning which helped the PRC government attain a position on the United Nations Security Council.

East Asia 

On the evening of 15 April 2018, Wang was received by his Japanese counterpart Taro Kono, on the first such official visit of a Foreign Minister of China to Japan since November 2009.

Canadian journalist incident 

During a joint news conference in Ottawa on 1 June 2016, with Canadian Minister of Foreign Affairs Stéphane Dion, Wang responded to Canadian reporter Amanda Connolly of online news site iPolitics over a question she raised regarding human rights in China, saying "Your question was full of prejudice against China and an arrogance that comes from I don't know where. This is totally unacceptable to me".

Xinjiang internment camps 

In 2018, Wang said the world should ignore "gossip" about Xinjiang internment camps. In March 2021, Wang said that "We welcome more people to visit Xinjiang - seeing is believing. This is the best way to debunk rumours." However, journalists from the British state broadcaster BBC claim to have been followed by unmarked cars, chased out of restaurants and shops, and compelled to delete footage while trying to report from Xinjiang.

Diplomatic recognition of PRC 

During Wang's current Foreign Ministry leadership, he has facilitated obtaining the diplomatic recognition of China by Panama in 2017 as well as getting the Dominican Republic and El Salvador to switch over in recognizing China (People's Republic of China) instead of Taiwan (Republic of China) in 2018.

Hong Kong 

In March 2021, Wang supported the decision to have only "patriots" rule Hong Kong, stating that "loving Hong Kong and loving the motherland are consistent requirements...in the past 24 years since Hong Kong's [handover], no one has cared more about the [SAR's] democracy, prosperity and stability than the central government."

COVID-19 

It was reported that during Wang's visit to Norway in August 2020, he said that while China was the first country to report the existence of the virus to the World Health Organization, "it does not mean that the virus originated in China. Actually, for the past months, we have seen reports ... showing that the virus emerged in different parts of the world, and may have emerged earlier than in China".

US sanctions 
On 22 February 2021, Wang urged the administration of US President Joe Biden to lift the sanctions on trade and people-to-people contact imposed by his predecessor, Donald Trump. At the Foreign Ministry forum on US-China relations, he said that the US "must not interfere in the internal affairs of China".

Afghanistan withdrawal  
Wang criticized the speed and timing of the withdrawal of the American-led NATO forces from Afghanistan and urged them to withdraw in a "responsible and orderly manner".

Russia 

On 28 July 2022, Wang attended the meeting of foreign ministers of the Shanghai Cooperation Organisation (SCO). He met with Russian Foreign Minister Sergey Lavrov, who praised the "traditional friendship" between Russia and China. In October 2022, he reaffirmed support for Russia, saying that China will "firmly support Russia, under the leadership of President Putin … to further establish Russia's status as a major power on the international stage". In December 2022, Wang defended China's position on the Russo-Ukrainian War and said that China would "deepen strategic mutual trust and mutually beneficial cooperation" with Russia".

Director of the Foreign Affairs Commission Office (2023-present) 
On 1 January 2023, Wang was appointed as the director of the Office of the CCP Central Foreign Affairs Commission, making him China's top diplomat under CCP general secretary Xi Jinping.

Peace proposal for Russo-Ukrainian war
In February 2023 Wang announced his peace initiative for the 2022 Russian invasion of Ukraine at the 59th Munich Security Conference. Wang chose to have his Chargé d'affaires Dai Bing not present his peace plan at the 18th plenary meeting of the Eleventh emergency special session of the United Nations General Assembly. He decided to have Dai mention his peace plan only by passing reference at the UN Security Council Briefing on Ukraine the next day, 24 February 2023.

While the plan attracted support from Hungarian PM Viktor Orban, NATO Secretary-General Jens Stoltenberg said that the plan “doesn’t have much credibility because [the Chinese] have not been able to condemn the illegal invasion of Ukraine.”

Awards and decorations
:
 Order of Danaker (2016)

:
 Hilal-e-Pakistan (2015)

See also 
 List of foreign ministers in 2017
 List of current foreign ministers

References

External links

 
 

1953 births
Living people
20th-century Chinese people
21st-century Chinese politicians
Ambassadors of China to Japan
China Foreign Affairs University alumni
Chinese Communist Party politicians from Beijing
Delegates to the 19th National Congress of the Chinese Communist Party
Delegates to the 20th National Congress of the Chinese Communist Party
Delegates to the 13th National People's Congress
Foreign Ministers of the People's Republic of China
Members of the 17th Central Committee of the Chinese Communist Party
Members of the 18th Central Committee of the Chinese Communist Party
Members of the 19th Central Committee of the Chinese Communist Party
Members of the 20th Politburo of the Chinese Communist Party
People's Republic of China politicians from Beijing
Recipients of Hilal-i-Pakistan
State councillors of China